Chanda Leigh Gunn (born January 27, 1980, in Huntington Beach, California) is an American ice hockey player. She won a bronze medal at the 2006 Winter Olympics. At the games in Turin, she played close to 250 minutes and had 50 saves with a save percentage of 89.3%.

Northeastern
In the 2003–04 season, Chanda Gunn was in her senior season led the Huskies to eight wins. In doing so, she broke two school records: registering 56 saves in a game and twice recording 23 saves in one period. In addition, she finished the season ranked first nationally in save percentage, with a .940 mark, and tenth in the nation with a 1.94 goals-against average. During the season, she was recognized twice as Hockey East Player of the Month. She ranked first in the conference in save percentage (.937) and third in goals-against average with a 2.01 GAA.  During her career, Gunn was a finalists for College Hockey's Humanitarian Award, presented annually to college hockey's finest citizen, in 2003 and 2004.

In 2004, Gunn was awarded the Honda Inspiration Award which is given to a collegiate athlete "who has overcome hardship and was able to return to play at the collegiate level". She overcame epilepsy, and rebounded to become an All-American hockey goalie.

Since the 2007–2008 season, Gunn is an assistant coach at Northeastern University under head coach Laura Schuler. The two-time All-America goaltender is coaching while continuing to pursue her international hockey career.

Private life
Gunn has epilepsy and is in therapy with Keppra. She is a spokesperson for Epilepsy Therapy Project.

Awards and honors
 2004 Honda Inspiration Award
2004 Finalist for Patty Kazmaier Award
 2003-04 Hockey East Three Stars Award
 2003-04 Hockey East Player of the Year 
 Top 10 Finalist for the 2002 Patty Kazmaier Memorial Awards
 Top 10 Finalist for the 2003 Patty Kazmaier Memorial Awards
 College Hockey's Humanitarian Award Winner (2003-2004 season)
 Finalist for College Hockey's Humanitarian Award (2003)
 Finalist for College Hockey's Humanitarian Award (2002)
 Hockey East 10th Anniversary Team selection

Notes

External links
Chanda Gunn's U.S. Olympic Team bio
Northeastern University Coaches bio

1980 births
American women's ice hockey goaltenders
Calgary Oval X-Treme players
Ice hockey players from California
Ice hockey players at the 2006 Winter Olympics
Living people
Medalists at the 2006 Winter Olympics
Northeastern Huskies women's ice hockey players
Olympic bronze medalists for the United States in ice hockey
People with epilepsy
Sportspeople from Huntington Beach, California